Namniwel Airport  is an airport close to the city of Namlea on the Buru island, which is one of the Maluku Islands in Indonesia.

Airlines and destinations

References

External links
Namlea Airport - Indonesia Airport Global Website
 

Airports in Maluku
Buru